Manshu may refer to:

 Manshu, a 9th-century Chinese text by Fan Chuo
 Su Manshu (18841918), Chinese writer, poet, painter, revolutionist, and translator
 , Japanese for Manchuria
  (AKA Manshū or Mansyû), active in the 1930s and 1940s
 Manshū Hayabusa, an airliner made by Manchukuo Aircraft Company in the late 1930s
 , the Manchukuo national airline 1931/3245
 Manshu-in (AKA Manshuin Monzeki), a Tendai temple located near the Shugakuin Imperial Villa at Sakyō-ku, Ichijo-ji, Takenouchi-cho, in northeast Kyoto, Japan.
 "Manshu Musume" (Japanese for "Manchurian Girl"), a Japanese hit song in 1938

See also 
 Manchu (disambiguation)
 Manchukuo